This is a list of the 18 bridges spanning the river Aare on the territory of the city of Bern, Switzerland.

With the historical city core situated on a steeply-flanked peninsula formed by the river, the Aare is a defining part of Bern's cityscape and features prominently in the city's 800-year history. Given its topography, the city's development in modern times was dependent on the construction of long high level bridges. Their construction in the 19th and 20th century at times stretched the limits of the possible.

The building of the great bridges was a continuous topic of political controversy in Bern up until World War II. The disputes about the location and even the construction materials of the bridges – stone or iron – reflected the rivalry between the city's conservative and liberal factions.


Bridge locations

Current bridges
In the table, "length" refers to the distance between abutments. The height is measured from the pavement to the mean water level.

Former bridges

Apart from the bridges that were rebuilt in the same spot, as noted above, one bridge no longer exists:

Ferries

Before the building of the major bridges, a number of ferries existed in Bern to carry passengers and cargo across the Aare. Two remain in service: 
The Reichenbach ferry is a cable ferry established in 1743. It links the tip of the Enge peninsula to Reichenbach Castle in Zollikofen.
The Zehndermätteli ferry is a cable ferry linking the Enge peninsula to Bremgarten.

See also
List of bridges in Switzerland

References
The data in this list are taken from Furrer, p. 154–164, unless otherwise noted.

Bibliography

External links

 

Bern
 
Berne
Aare bridges in Bern
Bridges
bridges